The 2001 Ballon d'Or, given to the best football player in Europe as judged by a panel of sports journalists from UEFA member countries, was awarded to Michael Owen on 18 December 2001.

Owen was the fourth English national to win the award after Stanley Matthews (1956), Bobby Charlton (1966) and Kevin Keegan (1978, 1979).

Rankings

References

External links
 France Football Official Ballon d'Or page

2001
2001–02 in European football